José Ballivián Segurola (5 May 1805 – 6 October 1852) was a Bolivian general during the Peruvian-Bolivian War. He also served as the ninth president of Bolivia from 1841 to 1847.

Early life
Born in La Paz to wealthy parents, Ballivián had a rather undistinguished military career until his elevation to the post of Commander of the Army in June 1841. He had been a royalist until 1822, but switched sides and joined Lanza's insurrectionist army at the age of 18. His advance in the Bolivian army was unremarkable, although his role was apparently fundamental to the Confederate triumph over Salaverry at the Battle of Socabaya in early 1836. Importantly, he had been a supporter of Santa Cruz in the 1830s.

The Battle of Ingavi 
His golden hour came, and he rose dramatically to the occasion, when at aged 37 and as Bolivian Army chief he united the pro-Velasco and pro-Santa Cruz factions under his command to face-off a massive Peruvian invasion led by President Agustín Gamarra. At the Battle of Ingavi (November 1841), Ballivián emerged with a surprising and crushing victory against Gamarra, whom he took prisoner and ordered executed. 

It was a stunning turn of events, and one that marks the highest point in Bolivian military history. Ingavi preserved Bolivian independence and transformed Ballivián into an overnight hero in a fractured nation badly in need of one. Congress almost immediately proclaimed him Provisional President in Calvo's replacement. Marshall Santa Cruz, from France, acquiesced to his rule and declined to return in the face of the enormous popularity of the new Caudillo.

President of Bolivia 

Elected at the ballot box in 1842, Ballivián was a capable leader who enacted important reforms, including a revision of the Constitution. Generally, he followed the organizational and administrative style of Santa Cruz and took great care to keep his supporters happy, thus positioning himself as the Grand Marshal's heir. It was Ballivián who ordered the first serious attempt at exploring and mapping the vastly unknown interior of the country and its frontiers. 

He also created the Department of Beni, and endeavored to establish Bolivian control over the sea-fronting Department of Litoral. Under his administration, the guano riches of that frontier region were exploited for the first time in earnest. However, he failed to create a credible deterrent military presence in the area, since he tended to concentrate loyal troops in the important centers of population in order to quell rebellions, especially after 1845.

Downfall and death 
Ballivián had the misfortune of experiencing the defection, and subsequent dogged personal opposition, of the charismatic General Manuel Belzu, once head of the Army but now wounded by the alleged or perceived pursuit of his Belzu's wife by the President. Belzu withdrew to the countryside with his followers in 1845 and, swearing revenge, all but declared war on Ballivián, igniting a massive confrontation that polarized Bolivian society. Little by little, the populist Belzu's legend grew, while Ballivián's became more tarnished, especially when the latter was forced to resort to increasingly authoritarian measures to keep control. 

Eventually, civil war-like conditions erupted, forcing the embattled Hero of Ingavi to flee shortly before Christmas of 1847. He left in his place General Eusebio Guilarte, head of the Council of State and second in line to the presidency in accordance to the new Constitution Ballivián himself had promulgated.

Following his exile in Chile, he moved to Rio de Janeiro, Brazil, where he remained the rest of his days. He suddenly died in 1852 in Rio de Janeiro, but is revered to this day as one of Bolivia's greatest Presidents and foremost military leaders. His remains were repatriated and he was given a lavish state funeral. José Ballivián's son, Adolfo Ballivián, followed in his father's footsteps and became Constitutional President of Bolivia in 1873.

References 

1805 births
1852 deaths
19th-century Bolivian politicians
Bolivian expatriates in Brazil
Bolivian expatriates in Peru
Bolivian generals
Defense ministers of Bolivia
Leaders who took power by coup
People from La Paz
People of the War of the Confederation
Presidents of Bolivia
Presidents of the Chamber of Deputies (Bolivia)
Bolivian exiles